William Gladstone Harvell (25 September 1907 – 13 May 1985) was a British cyclist who competed in the 1932 Summer Olympics.

Harvell won a bronze medal in the 10 Miles Scratch race at the 1934 British Empire Games in London. Harvell was a  British track champion, winning the British National Team Pursuit Championships in 1933 as part of the Poole Wheelers team.

References

1907 births
1985 deaths
English male cyclists
Olympic cyclists of Great Britain
Cyclists at the 1932 Summer Olympics
Olympic bronze medallists for Great Britain
Olympic medalists in cycling
People from Farnham
Medalists at the 1932 Summer Olympics
Cyclists at the 1934 British Empire Games
Commonwealth Games medallists in cycling
Commonwealth Games bronze medallists for England
Medallists at the 1934 British Empire Games